Atrabad may refer to:
 39 Atrabad-e Olya
 Atrabad-e Sofla
 It is a city in 39th state of 39th Iranian President who haven’t been  able to perform as he was a Muslim with a small wenus. This has lead to many 39 to be there in Oran. Hence most of Iranians are 39’s as they sell their women.